The Irish derby is a term given to football matches between Northern Ireland and Republic of Ireland. A total of 11 matches has been played with Republic of Ireland winning four as compared to Northern Ireland's two wins and five matches ending in a draw.

History
The rivalry started in the second half of the 19th century, as the sport was becoming popular on the island of Ireland, but due to it being most favoured among the Ulster Protestants community, the Irish Football Association was set up in Belfast rather than the capital city of Dublin. The Association was also biased towards Northern players: between its formation in 1882 and 1921, only 75 southern players were capped for the IFA's Ireland team compared to 798 from the north. Following the partition of Ireland, the Dublin-based Football Association of Ireland was established along with its own national side. Both bodies initially selected players from across the island with little problem (unlike the FAI team, the IFA side was not affiliated to FIFA and continued to take part in the British Home Championship). However, after the Home Nations rejoined FIFA after the Second World War, the 1950 FIFA World Cup qualification process involved both Ireland teams, and the FAI complained when the IFA selected four southern players, leading to FIFA ruling that the teams could only selected players from their own part of the island, and neither could be referred to as simply 'Ireland': from then on they were referred to as the Northern Ireland national football team and Republic of Ireland national football team, although the former continued to call themselves Ireland in the British Home Championship until the 1970s.

While attempts have been made to encourage a friendlier relationship between the teams and their communities in the wake of the 1998 Good Friday Agreement which did much to bring an end to the 30-year sectarian armed conflict in Northern Ireland, one aspect of that agreement has led to further sporting tension: citizens of Northern Ireland can classify as British or Irish, and several players raised in the North, including some who featured for Northern Ireland at youth and senior levels, have opted to play internationally for the Republic of Ireland, frustrating the selectors in Belfast who already have a limited pool of talent (a population of under two million – less than half of the Republic – and a smaller diaspora in Britain) to choose from.

List of matches

Statistics

All-time most appearances

References

International association football rivalries
Republic of Ireland national football team
Northern Ireland national football team
Politics and sports